The Mid West Football League was an Australian rules football competition based in the Eyre Peninsula region of South Australia, Australia.  It was wound up prior to the 2021 season after Wudinna and Central Eyre merged and transferred to the Eastern Eyre Football League.

Brief history 
The Mid West Football League was situated on the Eyre Peninsula in South Australia and fielded six teams in its final season in 2019 (the 2020 season was cancelled due to COVID-19). The MWFL formed by the merger of the Le Hunte Football League and the Streaky Bay Football League in 1988.

Eight clubs nominated for the inaugural season in 1988, with United FC and Wudinna FC amalgamating for the 1989 season. Foundation clubs Streaky Bay and Rovers amalgamated in the 1999 season leaving the current six clubs.

Formal competition games are held for A Grade, B Grade (Reserves) and Colts (Under 16).  Informal under 12 games are also held. The league colours are black and white and carry the Magpies logo.

Clubs
Central Eyre Football Club (Kyancutta/Warramboo area)

The club formed 1987 in the former Le Hunte Football League for one season with the merger of Kyancutta FC and Warramboo FC. It joined the MWFL as a founding club in 1988 and won the first premiership of the newly formed league.

The earliest origin can be traced back to Kyancutta FC who were formed 1918, with Warramboo formed in 1929, and Cootra East, Waddikee Rovers and Palabie the other clubs who have been within the clubs drawing area.

The club shares two home grounds, in Kyancutta and Warramboo. They have the colours of red, white and blue and are known as the Bulldogs.

Elliston Football Club (Elliston area)

The club joined from the Le Hunte Football League as a foundation member of the MWFL.

Elliston FC is the second oldest football club on the Eyre Peninsula formed in 1904. (The oldest is Cowell FC in Eastern Eyre FL). Other clubs that have existed in the current drawing area include Colton/Wedge, Sheringa, Colton, Mount Wedge, Talia and Kolballa.

Their home ground is in Elliston. They wear the colours of red and white and are known as the Roosters.

West Coast Hawks Football Club (Streaky Bay/Piednippie area)

The club was formed in 1999 from the merger of the Streaky Bay FC and the Rovers FC. Both clubs were foundation members of the MWFL.

The origins may be traced back to Streaky Bay FC (formed 1906) and Rovers FC (formed 1913). Other clubs in the drawing area include Streaky Bay, Flinders United, and Flinders although the borders are blurred with Western Districts.

The club shares two home grounds, in Streaky Bay and Piednippie. They wear the colours of dark blue and gold and are known as the Hawks.

Western Districts Football Club (Minnipa/Poochera area)

The club formed in 1988 as a foundation member of the MWFL. It was a merger of the Central Areas FC from the Streaky Bay Football League and the Minnipa FC from the Le Hunte Football League.

The earliest origin can be traced back to Calca in 1913, although there is a blur of the borders between the feeder clubs of the current Western Districts and the West Coast Hawks. The clubs that have been in the drawing area include Minnipa FC (formed 1917), Central Areas (formed 1971), Calca Chandada, Poochera, Chandada, Calca-Kenny, Port Kenny and Collie.

The club shares two home grounds, in Poochera and Minnipa. They wear the colours of dark green and gold and are known as the Tigers.

Wirrulla Football Club (Wirrulla/Smoky Bay area)

The club joined from the Streaky Bay Football League as a foundation member of the MWFL.

Wirrulla FC was formed in 1919. Many clubs have existed in their area including Yantanabie United, Cungena, Yantanabie, Kangaroos, Excelsiors, Pimbacarra and Carawa.

The club's home ground is in Wirrulla, and they wear the colours of black and red and are known as the Bombers.

Wudinna United Football Club (Wudinna/Yaninee area)

The club formed in 1989 with the merger of Wudinna FC and United FC, who both competed in the Le Hunte Football League, and then one season as separate entities in MWFL in 1988.

The earliest origin is via Wudinna FC and Yaninee (both formed in 1918). Other clubs previously in the drawing area include United and Pygery.

Their home ground is in Wudinna, and they share the league colours of black and white and the Magpies logo.

Final season clubs

2011 Ladder

2012 Ladder

2013 Ladder

2014 Ladder

2015 Ladder

2016 Ladder

2017 Ladder

2018 Ladder

References

External links 
 Footypedia - MWFL
 country footy
 Mid West Football League official website

Books
 Encyclopedia of South Australian country football clubs / compiled by Peter Lines. 
 South Australian country football digest / by Peter Lines 

Eyre Peninsula
Defunct Australian rules football competitions in South Australia